Both Sides Of An Evening is the fifth studio album and released in 1961 by The Everly Brothers. Though it was released at the peak of their career, it failed to make any of the record charts.

Fourteen songs were laid down for the album, in two halves (the first seven, for side A, were marked "For dancing", and the second seven, for side B, marked "For dreaming"). The completed album was recorded in only three days worth of sessions. It was produced by Bill Porter.

Prior to the album's release, half-minute excerpts of the songs were released on a Souvenir sampler, purchasable for a single dollar.

Reception

Writing for Allmusic, music critic Bruce Eder wrote of the album "...the duo's most ambitious and mature record to date, but it just wasn't terribly exciting or of much interest (especially the second side) to the teenagers that made up the vast bulk of their audience."

Track listing
Side one (For Dancing)
 "My Mammy" (Walter Donaldson, Joe Young, Sam M. Lewis) – 2:15
 "Muskrat" (Merle Travis, Tex Ann, Harold Hensley) – 2:18
 "My Gal Sal" (Paul Dressor) – 2:50
 "Grandfather's Clock" (Henry Clay Work) – 2:22
 "Bully of the Town" (Adapted by Ike Everly) – 2:01
 "Chlo-e" (Neil Moret, Gus Kahn) – 2:05
 "Mention My Name in Sheboygan" (Bob Hilliard, Dick Sanford, Samuel Mysels) – 1:51
Side two (For Dreaming)
"Hi-Lili, Hi-Lo" (Tim Kapper, Helen Deutsch) – 1:44
 "The Wayward Wind" (Herb Newman, Stanley Lebowsky) – 2:26
 "Don't Blame Me" (Jimmy McHugh, Dorothy Fields) – 3:26
 "Now Is the Hour" (Traditional) – 2:39
 "Little Old Lady" (Hoagy Carmichael, Stanley Adams) – 2:24
 "When I Grow Too Old to Dream" (Sigmund Romberg, Oscar Hammerstein II) – 2:30
 "Love Is Where You Find It" (Nacio Herb Brown, Earl Brent) – 1:48

Personnel
 Don Everly – guitar, vocals
 Phil Everly – guitar, vocals
 Chet Atkins – guitar
 Harold Bradley – guitar
 Hank Garland – guitar
 Ray Edenton - guitar
 Sammy Pruett - guitar
 Walter Haynes – steel guitar
 Lightnin' Chance - bass
 Marvin Hughes – piano
 Buddy Harman – drums
 Lou Busch – percussion, tambourine, cowbell

Production notes
 Andrew Sandoval – producer
 Bill Inglot – mastering
 Dan Hersch – mastering
 Bill Porter – engineer
 Andrew Sandoval – mastering
 Richie Unterberger – liner notes
 Teresa Woodward - cover painting

References

External links
 Collector's Choice Music reissue liner notes by Richie Unterberger.

1961 albums
The Everly Brothers albums
Warner Records albums